The 1992 Taça de Portugal Final was the final match of the 1991–92 Taça de Portugal, the 52nd season of the Taça de Portugal, the premier Portuguese football cup competition organized by the Portuguese Football Federation (FPF). The match was played on 24 May 1992 at the Estádio Nacional in Oeiras, and opposed two Primeira Liga sides from the same city: Boavista and Porto. Boavista defeated Porto 2–1 to claim the Taça de Portugal for a fourth time in their history.

In Portugal, the final was televised live on RTP. As a result of Boavista winning the Taça de Portugal, the Panteras qualified for the 1992 Supertaça Cândido de Oliveira where they took on their cup opponents who won the 1991–92 Primeira Divisão.

Match

Details

References

1992
1991–92 in Portuguese football
FC Porto matches
Boavista F.C. matches